Something in the Water is a 2008 Australian documentary film written and directed by Aidan O'Bryan. Using live, archival, and interview footage shot in Los Angeles, Melbourne, Perth, Sydney, and Windsor in Berkshire, England, it explores the history and environment behind the development of local and nationally acclaimed musical talent in Western Australia.

The film was funded by Perth media production company WBMC, headed by screenwriter/director Aidan O'Bryan and producer Janelle Landers.

The film follows the rise to fame of some of Western Australia's most successful musicians. Something in the Water features more than fifty interviews with bands including Little Birdy, The Waifs, The Sleepy Jackson, Eskimo Joe, End of Fashion, Jebediah, Le Hoodoo Gurus, The Panics and Red Jezebel. The film asks whether Perth's talented spawn can be attributed to the city's isolation, the environment or the music scene itself, or whether there is, in fact, something in the water.

Something in the Water premiered at the Astor Theatre in Perth and had a limited theatrical run in that city. It later was shown at the FTI Fremantle Film Festival and the 2008 WAMi Festival. An accompanying two-disc compilation of various Western Australian artists became available via MGM Distribution as well as online in January 2009.

The film was screened on ABC2 on 13 May 2009. Following this national broadcast, the film was released on DVD on 3 July 2009 via MGM Distribution. The DVD includes additional interview footage with Eskimo Joe, John Butler, The Triffids, Dave Faulkner and Kim Salmon.

Some people have noted that the film neglects to mention some of the more notable Perth performers from the 1970s and even 1960s.  While Johnny Young makes an appearance, other performers like Glen Ingram & The Hi-Five, Bakery, The Elks, Fatty Lumpkin, Sid Rumpo, Dave Warner, The Dugites and Rip Torn & The Stockings and groundbreaking producer Martin Clark and his Clarion Records are completely ignored (although The Dugites do make an appearance on the film's soundtrack double CD release).

Featured entertainers

Eskimo Joe
Little Birdy
John Butler Trio
The Sleepy Jackson
The Triffids
Hoodoo Gurus
The Scientists
Rolf Harris
Baby Animals
Red Jezebel
Schvendes
Robbie Buck and Richard Kingsmill from triple j
Stephen Malkmus from Pavement
The Kill Devil Hills
Birds of Tokyo
Karnivool
Snowman
The Victims
The Silents
Johnny Young
Gyroscope
The Stems
The Panics
Sugar Army
The Panda Band
Bob Evans
Jebediah
Sex Panther
Abbe May
The Waifs
End of Fashion
INXS

Soundtrack
The soundtrack includes music from the film as well as music that inspired the film.

Track listing

References

Additional sources 
PerthNow, 21 December 2007
PerthNow, 12 January 2008
XPress, 17 January 2008
The West Australian, 2 February 2008
The Drum Media, 24 January 2008
jmag, February 2008
FasterLouder.com.au 
Perth NORG
Perfkids
NorgBlog
Inside Film

External links
Official website
Something in the Water at the Internet Movie Database
Something in the Water at MySpace
Something in the Water at YouTube
Something in the Water at the National Film and Sound Archive
Bakery at Milesago
Fatty Lumpkin at Milesago
Martin Clark at Milesago
Clarion Records at Milesago

See also
Western Australian Music Industry Association

2008 films
Culture of Western Australia
Australian documentary films
Documentary films about music and musicians
2000s English-language films